The 18th Army of the Soviet Union's Red Army was formed on 21 June 1941 on the basis of HQ Kharkov  Military District and armies of the Kiev Special Military District.

The Army's commander in 1941 was General-Lieutenant Andrey Smirnov. The Army composition on the beginning of the war was:
16th Mechanised Corps
15th Tank Division, 39th Tank Division, 240th Mechanised Division, 64th Fighter Air Division and 45th Mixed Air Division
17th Rifle Corps
96th Mountain Rifle Division, 60th Mountain Rifle Division, 164th Rifle Division
18th Mechanised Corps
47th Tank Division, 218th Mechanised Division
55th Rifle Corps
130th Rifle Division, 160th Rifle Division, 189th Rifle Division, 4th Independent Tank Brigade

It was caught soon after the start of Operation Barbarossa in 1941 in a huge encirclement south of Kiev along with the 6th Army and 12th Armies. This encirclement was part of the Battle of Uman. A further formation was shattered during the Battle of the Sea of Azov in September–October 1941.

On 1 October 1943 the army consisted of 20th Rifle Corps (8th Guards Rifle Brigade, 81st and 83rd Naval Rifle Brigades), 55th Guards Rifle Division, 89th Rifle Division, 176th, 318th, 414th Rifle Divisions, 107th Rifle Brigade, 255th Naval Infantry Brigade, 10th Guards Separate Antitank Battalion, artillery, armoured forces, and engineers.

As part of Southern, North-Caucasian, Transcaucasian Front, and the 1st and 4th Ukrainian Fronts the 18th Army conducted defensive operations in right-bank Ukraine, participated in Donbass, the Rostov defensive and offensive operations, and in the fight for Caucasus. Based on the experience of the Kerch - Eltigen landing operation, the Army was uniquely identified as 18th Desant Army for amphibious operations, between 15 February and 5 April 1944 around Malaya Zemlya.

For this operation the Army included:
 10th Guards Rifle Corps
 16th Rifle Corps
 176th Rifle Division
 318th Rifle Division
 5th Guards Tank Brigade
 also two artillery regiments of the High Command Reserve, a regiment of Guards mortars (multiple rocket launchers), desant detachment of Major Kunikov, and elements of the 255th and 83rd Naval Infantry Brigades, elements of 107th and 165th Rifle Brigades, 31st Desant Regiment, machine gun battalion and 29th Tank Destroyer Regiment, all under command of Army Operational Group Grechkin (commanding officer General-Major А.А. Grechkin).

The Army reverted to its previous designation for the clearing of right-bank Ukraine, Hungary, Poland and Czechoslovakia. For much of this period the 24th Rifle Division served with 18th Army, and the Division was still serving with the Army in May 1945, along with the 17th Rifle Corps (8th and 138th Rifle Divisions) and a Fortified Region.

After World War II, the 18th Army was transformed into a Mountain Army in the territory of the Carpathian Military District and Northern Bukovina.  This army was disbanded in May 1946.  Some of its elements, along with parts of the 52nd Army were used to form the 8th Mechanised Army.

Commanders
Andrey Smirnov (June - October 1941), Lieutenant General, killed in action
Vladimir Kolpakchi (October - November 1941), Major General
Fyodor Kamkov (November 1941 - February 1942 and April - October, 19th 1942), Major General
Ilya Smirnov (February - April 1942), Lieutenant General
Andrei Grechko (October 1942 - January, 5th 1943), Major General
Aleksandr Ryzhov (January - February, 11th 1943), Major General
Konstantin Koroteyev (February - March, 16th 1943), Major General
Konstantin Leselidze (March 1943 - on February, 6th 1944), Lieutenant General promoted  to Colonel General in October 1943
Yevgeny Zhuravlev (February - November 1944), Lieutenant General
Anton Gastilovich (November 1944 - May 1945), Major General, since January 1945 Lieutenant General

Sources and references

http://samsv.narod.ru/Arm/a18/arm.html
Feskov et al., The Soviet Army in the Period of Cold War, 2004, Tomsk University Press, Tomsk
Ukrainian Book of Memory, Vol VIII, http://memory.dag.com.ua/browse?1270
Victory site https://web.archive.org/web/20160521225208/http://victory.mil.ru/ by the Ministry of Defence of the Russian Federation

018
Military units and formations established in 1941
Military units and formations disestablished in 1946